Streptomyces galbus is a bacterium species from the genus of Streptomyces which has been isolated from soil from West Bengal. Streptomyces galbus produces xylanase, galbonolides A, galbonolides B and the actinomycin X complex.

Further reading

See also 
 List of Streptomyces species

References

External links
Type strain of Streptomyces galbus at BacDive -  the Bacterial Diversity Metadatabase

galbus
Bacteria described in 1959